Cryptolechia acutiuscula is a moth in the family Depressariidae. It was described by Wang in 2004. It lives in Guizhou, China.

References

Moths described in 2004
Cryptolechia (moth)